Cory Conacher (born December 14, 1989) is a Canadian professional ice hockey centre who is currently playing for the Charlotte Checkers of the American Hockey League (AHL).

Playing career
Growing up in Burlington, Ontario, Conacher spent most of his minor hockey career playing AAA and AA hockey in the OMHA's Tri-County League until playing AAA at Major Midget in 2005-06 season. He spent 1 year playing Midget for the Eagles before graduating as a 17-year-old to the OJHL's Burlington Cougars Jr.A. club in 2006-07.

Prior to turning professional, Conacher played college hockey at Canisius College with the Canisius Golden Griffins men's ice hockey team. He would ultimately become the school's all-time leader in points (147), goals (62) and game-winning goals (12) in 129 games. 

Largely due to his diminutive size, Conacher went undrafted through his four years with Canisius. However, Conacher became the program's most decorated player, setting 12 records. He graduated with a degree in Finance. He was subsequently signed after his senior year in 2010–11 to amateur try-out contracts with the Rochester Americans, Cincinnati Cyclones and the Milwaukee Admirals. As a free agent on July 6, 2011, Conacher signed a one-year contract with the Norfolk Admirals of the AHL.

In the 2011–12 season, after attending the Tampa Bay Lightning pre-season camp, Conacher was selected to play in the 2012 AHL All-Star Classic, after leading all rookies in scoring. While leading the Admirals in goals and points, Conacher signed a two-year, two-way contract with the Admirals' NHL affiliate, the Tampa Bay Lightning, on March 1, 2012. Upon helping the Admirals capture their first Calder Cup, Conacher's successful season was rewarded with the Les Cunningham Award as the league's MVP, becoming just the fourth rookie to win it since it was first presented in 1948. Conacher was subsequently awarded the Dudley "Red" Garrett Memorial Award and was also named to the AHL All-Rookie team and the Second AHL All-Star Team.

With the NHL lockout in effect, Conacher started the 2012–13 season with Tampa's new AHL affiliate, the Syracuse Crunch. Once the lockout concluded Conacher was recalled by the Lightning to attend training camp for the shortened NHL season. He immediately made an impact with Tampa Bay, scoring his first NHL goal in his first NHL game on January 19, 2013, on opening night against Braden Holtby of the Washington Capitals in a 6-3 win. Conacher continued to be productive and placed second in NHL rookie scoring with 24 points in 35 games before being dealt at the trade deadline (along with a 2013 fourth-round draft pick) to the Ottawa Senators in exchange for goaltender Ben Bishop on April 3, 2013.

Conacher's first full season with the Senators was a difficult one, as he struggled to find offensive consistency. Through his first 58 games of the season he recorded only four goals and was a healthy scratch on multiple occasions. Conacher's offensive struggles were perhaps magnified by the fact that goaltender Bishop, the player he had been traded for, was playing very well in Tampa Bay and was frequently receiving mention as a Vezina Trophy candidate. On March 4, 2014, the eve of the 2013–14 NHL trade deadline, Conacher was placed on waivers by the Senators. He was subsequently claimed by the Buffalo Sabres on March 5, 2014.

The Sabres declined to offer Conacher a contract extension, which allowed him to become a free agent on June 30, 2014. The team was undecided in regard to retaining his rights, only deciding at the last minute to release him.

On July 1, 2014, Conacher was signed as a free agent by the New York Islanders on a one-year, $600,000 contract. After playing in 15 of the team's first 29 games, Conacher was placed on waivers by the Islanders on December 12, 2014. He cleared waivers and was assigned to the team's minor league affiliate, Bridgeport Sound Tigers, the following day. On March 2, 2015, Conacher was traded to the Vancouver Canucks, in exchange for Utica Comets player Dustin Jeffrey. He was assigned to AHL affiliate, the Utica Comets, securing an offensive role to help the club reach the Calder Cup finals.

On July 1, 2015, Conacher left the NHL as a free agent and signed a two-year contract with Swiss club, SC Bern, of the NLA. In December 2015, he was selected to play for Team Canada at the Spengler Cup and helped win the title, while being named to the tournament's all-star team. He won the National League A title that same season with SC Bern, scoring 5 goals in 14 playoffs games.

On July 13, 2016, Conacher once again signed with the Tampa Bay Lightning of the National Hockey League to a one-year, one-way contract. On January 29, 2017, Conacher was added to the 2017 American Hockey League All-Star Classic roster. Conacher will represent the Crunch on the North Division All-Star team. On April 6, 2017, Conacher was named to the 2016-17 AHL ALL-Star Second Team. On June 28, 2017, the Lightning announced that it had re-signed Conacher to a two-year, $1.3 million contract extension. On October 17, 2018, the Lightning re-signed Conacher to a one-year contract extension.

On July 28, 2020, Conacher returned to the National League (NL) and agreed to a three-year contract with Lausanne HC. On February 16, 2021, Conacher moved to former club, SC Bern. Conacher signed a new 3-year deal with SCB, keeping him at the club through to the end of the 2022/23 season. On February 23, 2022, SC Bern announced that Conacher would be loaned to HC Ambrì-Piotta for the remainder of the season.

After two seasons in Switzerland, and with a desire to play closer to home, Conacher opted to return to North America for the 2022–23 season and signed a professional tryout contract with the Belleville Senators of the AHL, affiliate of former club the Ottawa Senators, on November 1, 2022. Conacher featured in just 2 games with Belleville before suffering a long-term injury in which he was released upon his recovery. 

On February 22, 2023, Conacher continued in the AHL by signing a PTO with the Charlotte Checkers, affiliate to the Florida Panthers.

Personal
Conacher was born with a bladder exstrophy, a rare condition in which his bladder was outside his body. When he was ten days old he underwent a ten-hour surgical procedure in which doctors reconstructed his pelvis in order to place his bladder back into his body. The situation was so severe that doctors informed his parents that he might never walk properly. Additionally, Conacher was diagnosed with Type 1 Diabetes at the age of eight. When not playing he often has an insulin pump attached to his hip to regulate his blood glucose levels.

Conacher is a distant relative of Hockey Hall of Famers Charlie, Roy, and Lionel Conacher, but despite rumours to the contrary, he is not related to former NHL forward Pat Conacher. Cory Conacher has a younger brother, Shane Conacher, playing for the Adirondack Thunder. Both starred at Canisius College, but were never teammates. Cory graduated in 2011, while Shane matriculated in 2013.

Career statistics

Regular season and playoffs

International

Awards and honours

References

External links

 

1989 births
Living people
HC Ambrì-Piotta players
Belleville Senators players
SC Bern players
Bridgeport Sound Tigers players
Buffalo Sabres players
Canadian ice hockey centres
Canisius Golden Griffins men's ice hockey players
Charlotte Checkers (2010–) players
Cincinnati Cyclones (ECHL) players
Lausanne HC players
Milwaukee Admirals players
New York Islanders players
Norfolk Admirals players
Ottawa Senators players
Rochester Americans players
Syracuse Crunch players
Tampa Bay Lightning players
Undrafted National Hockey League players
Utica Comets players
Ice hockey people from Ontario
Sportspeople from Burlington, Ontario
Canadian expatriate ice hockey players in Switzerland
People with type 1 diabetes